Ryan James Hurd (born November 2, 1986) is an American country music singer and songwriter. In addition to writing No. 1 singles for Blake Shelton, Lady A, and Luke Bryan, Hurd has recorded for RCA Records Nashville.

Career 
Hurd was born in Chicago, Illinois and raised in Kalamazoo, Michigan before moving to Nashville, Tennessee. Hurd met his future wife Maren Morris while writing the ballad “Last Turn Home” for Tim McGraw.

In 2014, Hurd co-wrote the song "Intoxicated" with the band Hinder, the song was released as the third single from their 2015 album "When the Smoke Clears and debuted #8 on the US Active Rock Chart.

In 2015, Hurd wrote "Lonely Tonight", a No 1 Country Airplay single for Blake Shelton and Ashley Monroe.

Hurd signed with Sony Music Nashville in 2017 to release a forthcoming debut album.
His first single from his self-titled EP, “We Do Us” has received over 2 million streams on Spotify.

Hurd was featured on Rolling Stone Country's "Artists You Need to Know" list. and CMT named him one of their "Listen Up" Artists of 2016. Hurd has also toured with Chase Rice, Thomas Rhett, Florida Georgia Line, and Morris. Hurd's debut single was "Love in a Bar". In January 2020, he embarked on a tour in support of his Platonic EP with Adam Doleac and Niko Moon.

In 2021, Hurd released his most successful single. "Chasing After You", the first duet he recorded with his wife Maren Morris. The song is his first top 10 hit on the country charts, and reached No. 23 on the Hot 100. The song is the lead single from his album Pelago, which was released on October 15, 2021.

Personal life
Hurd and Maren Morris were married on March 24, 2018, in Nashville, Tennessee. On March 23, 2020, Morris gave birth to their son.

Discography

Studio albums

Extended plays

Singles

Promotional singles

Music videos

Notes

References

External links
RyanHurd.com

American country singer-songwriters
American male singer-songwriters
Living people
People from Kalamazoo, Michigan
RCA Records Nashville artists
21st-century American singers
Country musicians from Michigan
21st-century American male singers
1986 births
Singer-songwriters from Michigan